Ahmed Mohamed Hesham El-Sayed (born 15 May 2000), known as Ahmed Hesham, Ahmed Mohamed, or Ahmed Mohamed  Hesham, is an Egyptian handball player who plays for USAM Nîmes Gard and the Egyptian national team. He competed at the 2019 Men's Youth World Handball Championship, where he took the best player award (MVP), as well as the 2020 Summer Olympics.

References

External links
 
 Ahmed Hesham Elsayed at NBC Olympics
 
 

2000 births
Living people
Egyptian male handball players
Olympic handball players of Egypt
Handball players at the 2020 Summer Olympics
21st-century Egyptian people